Ciniod of the Picts may refer to:
Ciniod I of the Picts (?-775)
Ciniod II of the Picts (fl. 842)
Ciniod III of the Picts (before 967–1005)